Antonín Procházka (5 June 1882, in Vážany – 9 June 1945, in Brno) was a Czech Modernist painter and graphic artist.

Biography 
He graduated from the gymnasium in Kroměříž then, in 1902, began studies at the Academy of Arts, Architecture and Design in Prague with Vlaho Bukovac, Hanuš Schwaiger and Max Švabinský. It was then that he was introduced to the newest art movements, such as Fauvism and Cubism.

In 1911, he married the German painter, whom he had met while travelling. Two years later, Herwarth Walden invited him, Filla, Kubin and Vincenc Beneš to participate in the Erster Deutscher Herbstsalon (Autumn Salon) in Berlin, where he displayed a Cubist still-life.

He became a drawing teacher at a girls' school in Brno in 1924. There, in 1938, he created a monumental painting, "Prometheus Bringing Fire to Mankind" for Masaryk University. During the German Occupation, he provided illustrations for a collection of folk ballads by Karel Jaromír Erben.

From 1909 to 1911, and again from 1923 to 1929, he was a member of the Mánes Union of Fine Arts. Originally an Expressionist, he moved through Cubism to create his own personal form of Neo-Classicism. He also created some small equestrian statues of President Tomáš Masaryk.

In 1946, he received the posthumous title of "" (People's Artist) from the Czechoslovak Republic. A street in Brno is named after him.

Selected paintings

References

Further reading 
 Albert Kutal: Antonín Procházka, State Exposition of Fiction, Music and Art, Prague, 1959. 
 Ludvík Ševeček (ed.), Antonín Procházka 1882-1945: obrazy, kresby, grafika (exhibition catalog), Moravian Gallery, 1979

External links 

The Art of Antonín Procházka @ Très Bohèmes
ArtNet: More works by Procházka.
 

1882 births
1945 deaths
Burials at Brno Central Cemetery
20th-century Czech painters
Cubist artists
Neoclassicism
People from Vyškov District
Czech male painters
20th-century Czech male artists
Academy of Arts, Architecture and Design in Prague alumni